The October 2022 Conservative Party leadership election was triggered by Liz Truss's announcement that she would resign as Leader of the Conservative Party and Prime Minister of the United Kingdom, amid an economic and political crisis.

In the July-September 2022 Conservative Party leadership election, Truss was elected to succeed Boris Johnson, who had resigned in an earlier government crisis following a string of controversies that characterised Johnson's premiership and severely damaged his personal reputation. Truss was appointed prime minister by Queen Elizabeth II two days before the monarch's death; her government's business was subsequently suspended during a national mourning period of 10 days. To tackle the cost of living and energy supply crises, Truss's government announced the Energy Price Guarantee to limit energy prices for households, businesses and public-sector organisations. Her government then announced large-scale borrowing and tax cuts in a mini-budget, which was widely criticised and largely reversed, having led to financial instability. Facing mounting criticism and loss of confidence in her leadership, Truss announced that she would resign as leader of the Conservative Party, and also announced that she would remain as prime minister until a successor was elected.

Following a change of rules by the 1922 Committee, each potential leader needed the support of at least 100 MPs to be a candidate in the vote, with a deadline of 2 pm on 24 October to secure enough nominations. Two candidates put their names forward: Penny Mordaunt, Leader of the House of Commons and Lord President of the Council, and Rishi Sunak, former Chancellor of the Exchequer. Johnson was expected to enter the contest; it was stated he had exceeded the required number of MP backers but nevertheless decided not to stand. On 24 October, Mordaunt withdrew from the contest less than two minutes before the deadline for nominations, leaving Sunak the only candidate in the contest and enabling him to become party leader without a ballot of MPs or party members. It was the first time a candidate won a Conservative leadership election unopposed since Michael Howard won in 2003 following the resignation of Iain Duncan Smith.

Background

Johnson premiership 

After Theresa May resigned as Prime Minister of the United Kingdom in 2019, Boris Johnson, who had served as mayor of London and as foreign secretary, won the leadership election and became Prime Minister. With insufficient parliamentary support for his Brexit plans, Johnson called the 2019 general election, in which he won a landslide victory.

Less than two months after the 2019 general election, cases of COVID-19 had reached the UK, and the government introduced measures to reduce its spread, including several legally-enforced lockdowns. The media later reported that there had been social gatherings by the Conservative Party and government staff that contravened these restrictions. Johnson was personally implicated, and he, his wife Carrie Johnson, and the chancellor of the Exchequer, Rishi Sunak, were given fixed penalty notices by the police in April 2022. Several Conservative MPs called for Johnson to resign, and one, Christian Wakeford, defected to the Labour Party.

In late June 2022, the Conservative MP Chris Pincher resigned as deputy chief government whip after allegations that he had groped two men. Johnson initially refused to suspend the whip from him, and his spokesperson defended Pincher's appointment, saying Johnson had not been aware of "specific allegations" against him. More allegations of groping were made against Pincher. On 4 July, Johnson's spokesperson said that Johnson was aware of allegations that were "either resolved or did not proceed to a formal complaint" at the time he appointed him. Several ministers resigned on 5 July, including the chancellor of the Exchequer Sunak and the health secretary Sajid Javid. Several politicians who had been discussed as potential leadership candidates, including Liz Truss, expressed their continuing support for Johnson. Johnson announced his resignation as leader of the Conservative Party and prime minister of the United Kingdom in July 2022, causing the July–September 2022 leadership election.

Truss premiership 

Eleven candidates put themselves forward for the July leadership election, with eight receiving sufficient nominations from Conservative MPs: Kemi Badenoch, Suella Braverman, Jeremy Hunt, Penny Mordaunt, Rishi Sunak, Liz Truss, Tom Tugendhat, and Nadhim Zahawi. After five rounds of voting over nine days, MPs selected Sunak and Truss to be put forward as candidates for party members to vote on. On 5 September, after a seven-week campaign period, Truss was announced as the new leader of the party after receiving 57.4% of the members' vote and was duly appointed as Prime Minister by Queen Elizabeth II on 6 September 2022 during an audience held at Balmoral Castle. Later that day, Truss announced the composition of the new Cabinet with Kwasi Kwarteng appointed as Chancellor of the Exchequer.

On 23 September, Kwarteng delivered a Ministerial Statement entitled "The Growth Plan" to the House of Commons. Widely referred to in the media as the mini-budget, it proposed tax cuts and increased spending, and was followed by a sharp fall in the value of the pound against the United States dollar. Amidst widespread criticism, Truss and Kwarteng defended the budget for more than a week before beginning to announce reversals of the most controversial measures: the abolition of the 45% income tax rate for the highest earners, and cancellation of a planned freeze in corporation tax. Truss sacked Kwarteng and replaced him with Jeremy Hunt on 14 October. 

On 19 October, Suella Braverman resigned as home secretary citing a breach of the Ministerial Code and "concerns about the direction of this government". Later that evening, there were allegations of bullying, physical intimidation, and voting pressure over a Labour-introduced motion in the House of Commons on the issue of fracking, and confusion about whether Conservative MPs were to treat this vote as a matter of confidence in the government. 

On 20 October, Truss announced her resignation as leader of the party and prime minister, after meeting with Sir Graham Brady, chairman of the 1922 Committee.

Campaign

On 20 October, Rishi Sunak, the former Chancellor of the Exchequer who came second in the September leadership election, Penny Mordaunt, the Leader of the House of Commons who came third, and Boris Johnson, who was the leader and Prime Minister before Truss, were seen as the most likely candidates.

On 20 October, the online bookmaker Betfair listed Sunak as the favourite to become the new Conservative Party leader with odds of 11/10, with Mordaunt second at 7/2, Wallace third at 8/1, Hunt fourth at 9/1 and Johnson fifth at 13/1.

While many MPs supported Johnson, others said they would not serve under him if he were elected. Mordaunt was reported to be taking soundings as to whether she should run on the evening of 20 October and morning of 21 October. On the afternoon of 21 October she became the first candidate to announce her intention to run. By the morning of 22 October, Sunak's supporters said he had passed the nomination threshold of 100 MPs, although he had yet to formally launch his campaign. Johnson flew back from a holiday in the Dominican Republic on the morning of Saturday 22 October, and by that afternoon, Johnson supporters said that he had sufficient nominations too. Reports of Johnson reaching the nomination threshold, which were later confirmed as being true by Sir Graham Brady, were met with scepticism by some Sunak supporters, who challenged the Johnson camp to release the names of his supporters. On the evening of 22 October, Sunak and Johnson met, although what they discussed was not disclosed.

On the afternoon of 23 October, Sunak declared he would stand in the contest. On the afternoon of the same day, Johnson spoke to Penny Mordaunt, with press speculation being that she had rejected an offer asking her to drop out of the leadership contest and back him. Later that day, Johnson said he would not be standing.

On the afternoon on 24 October, Mordaunt pulled out of the race after being unable to get the nominations of 100 MPs by the deadline. As a result of Mordaunt's withdrawal, Sunak won the leadership contest unopposed, and became the leader of the Conservative Party. It was the first time a candidate won a leadership election unopposed since Gordon Brown won the Labour Party leadership election to succeed Tony Blair in 2007.

Election process 
In her resignation statement on 20 October, Truss stated that the election would be completed "within the next week". Graham Brady set out an expedited process. Candidates were required to obtain nominations from at least 100 MPs before the nomination deadline at 2 pm on 24 October. With 357 Conservative MPs at the time of election, this meant there could have only been, at most, three candidates. 

Had three candidates reached the nomination threshold, a ballot of Conservative MPs would have been held to eliminate one that afternoon. An indicative vote by Conservative MPs between the final two would have then been held. Subsequently, there would have been an online ballot of Conservative Party members to choose between the two remaining candidates. This would have opened on Tuesday 25 October and closed at 11 am on Friday 28 October. If two candidates had reached the nomination threshold, there would have been an indicative vote by MPs, then an online members' vote, with the same schedule.

As only Rishi Sunak received the nominations required by Monday 24 October, he automatically became party leader.

The timetable was much shorter than the previous leadership election, with a higher bar for nominations. These changes, and the addition of an indicative vote by MPs between two final candidates, were introduced to narrow the field more quickly and reduce the likelihood that a ballot of party members would be required.

Candidates

Declared

Withdrawn 
Penny Mordaunt declared her intention to stand for leadership but subsequently withdrew from the race.

Explored 
Boris Johnson initially explored a possible candidacy for the leadership but subsequently declined to stand.

Declined 
The following Conservative Party politicians were suggested by commentators as potential candidates for the leadership but declined to stand:

 Kemi Badenoch, former Secretary of State for International Trade (September 2022February 2023) and MP for Saffron Walden (2017–present) (endorsed Sunak)
 Suella Braverman,  Home Secretary (6 September 202219 October 2022), (25 October 2022present) and MP for Fareham (2015–present) (endorsed Sunak)
 James Cleverly, Foreign Secretary (September 2022present) and MP for Braintree (2015–present) (endorsed Johnson then Sunak)
 Michael Gove, Secretary of State for Levelling Up, Housing and Communities (September 2021July 2022), (October 2022 - present) and MP for Surrey Heath (2005–present) (endorsed Sunak)
 Jeremy Hunt, Chancellor of the Exchequer (October 2022present) and MP for South West Surrey (2005–present) (endorsed Sunak)
 Sajid Javid, former Chancellor of the Exchequer (July 2019February 2020) and MP for Bromsgrove (2010–present) (endorsed Sunak)
 Brandon Lewis, former Secretary of State for Justice (September 2022October 2022) and MP for Great Yarmouth (2010–present) (endorsed Sunak)
Theresa May, former Prime Minister (July 2016July 2019) and MP for Maidenhead (1997–present)
 Grant Shapps, former Home Secretary (19 October 202225 October 2022) and MP for Welwyn Hatfield (2005–present) (endorsed Sunak)
 Tom Tugendhat, Minister of State for Security (September 2022present) and MP for Tonbridge and Malling (2015–present) (endorsed Sunak)
 Ben Wallace, Secretary of State for Defence (July 2019present) and MP for Wyre and Preston North (2005–present) (endorsed Johnson)

Endorsements 

Note: Some endorsements are repeated due to MPs changing support after withdrawal.

Responses
While Sunak polled better than Truss, opinion polling continued to show the Conservatives losing to Labour shortly after Sunak became leader.

After Sunak's cabinet reshuffle, a Downing Street source said "it reflects a unified party and a cabinet with significant experience". Many Conservative members were critical of the election, due to the lack of a members' vote and the unopposed candidate, characterising it as anti-democratic. Certain Tory MPs were unconvinced by the election, and stated that factionalism within the party was unlikely to disappear. Particularly, many Boris Johnson supporters felt cheated as they had voiced their vocal opposition to Sunak. 

The election has been characterised as undemocratic in an opinion piece by a Liverpool Echo journalist, by those on the left according to Time, by Tortoise Media who plan to mount a legal challenge, and by opposition parties (including the Scottish National Party) as they call for a general election. The Labour Party (and specifically Keir Starmer) has called for an early general election. Immediately following the election a poll conducted by Ipsos found that 62% of respondents wanted a general election.

Polling

Conservative members 
Multi-candidate polling

Liz Truss resignation polling

2019 Conservative voters 
Multi-candidate polling

General population 
Head-to-head polling

Multi-candidate polling

References

2022 in British politics
2022 Conservative Party (UK) leadership elections
United Kingdom
October 2022 events in the United Kingdom
Uncontested elections
Rishi Sunak
British Indian history